Voorhoeve is a Dutch surname. Notable people with the surname include:

Clemens Voorhoeve (born 1930), Dutch linguist
Joris Voorhoeve (born 1945), Dutch politician and academic
Marc Voorhoeve (1950–2011), Dutch mathematician
Voorhoeve index of a complex function, introduced by Marc Voorhoeve

Dutch-language surnames